The Talysh people ( تالشان;) are an Iranian ethnic group indigenous to a region shared between Azerbaijan and Iran which spans the South Caucasus and the southwestern shore of the Caspian Sea. They speak the Talysh language, one of the Northwestern Iranian languages. It is spoken in the northern regions of the Iranian provinces of Gilan and Ardabil and the southern parts of the Republic of Azerbaijan. The areas in the Republic of Azerbaijan where Northern Talysh is spoken was historically known as Talish-i Gushtasbi. In Iran there is a Talesh County in Gilan Province.

Origins 
The Talyshis have traditionally inhabited the Talish district in the southwestern part of the Caspian Sea, which is usually considered to extend more than 150 km. Today, the northern part of Talish is located in the Republic of Azerbaijan, encompassing the districts of Lankaran, Astara, Lerik, Masally, and Yardimli. The southern part of Talish encompasses the western part of the Gilan province of Iran, extending to the village of Kapurchal.

It is challenging to determine the Talyshis origin because so little is known about them prior to the modern era. Like other ethnonyms, the name Tāliš cannot be established with certainty. It appears in early Arabic sources as al-Țaylasān. According to Al-Tabari (died 923); "In the mountains surrounding Azarbaijan there used to live such peoples as the Gels and the al-Taylasan, who did not obey the Arabs and mastered their freedom and independence". In Persian, they are called Țālišān and Țavāliš, both plural versions of Tāliš. The native transliteration of Tāliš first appears in the 16th-century, in the Armenian version of the Alexander Romance; "And he related that he is a refugee from the Caspian gates, near the country of Talish, in the province of Gilan."

Local Talysh experts commonly claim that the Talyshis are descended from the Cadusii, an ancient tribe which inhabited the district. According to Garnik Asatrian and Habib Borjian; "this is one of the rare cases when a folk self-identification with an ancient people can be, at least tentatively, substantiated with historical and linguistic backgrounds." The Iranologist Richard N. Frye believed that the Talyshis are possibly descended from the Cadusii.

History

Safavid period
Talish has traditionally been associated with either Gilan or Mughan, especially with Ardabil, the center of the latter, which appears to have shared a similar linguistic and ethnic bond with Talish prior to the Turkicization of Iranian Azerbaijan. This connection was still apparent during the time of the early Safavids, who were descended from Safi-ad-din Ardabili (died 1334), a disciple of Zahed Gilani (died 1301), who was of probable Talysh descent. Two out of the four Sufi teachers of the first Safavid monarch Shah Ismail I carried the epithet "Talishi". Other figures with the same epithet served as governmental officials under the Safavids and their successors. Several Talysh chieftains were one of the first supporters of the Safavids, who gave them the governorship of Astara, which was part of the province of Azerbaijan. The governor of Astara was also known as the hakem (governor) of Talish, which indicates that Astara was the capital of the district. From 1539 and onwards the governorship of Astara was held hereditarily by the family of Bayandor Khan Talesh. 

Talish was composed of various fiefs which would sometimes be granted to other emirs than the governor of Talish. For instance, Mohammad Khan Torkman was given control over a number of fiefs in Talish and Mughan in 1586. Later in 1684, Safiqoli Khan was one of the officers in control of Lankaran, and Hoseyn was another. Meanwhile, the unnamed governor of Talish lived in Ardabil. The Safavid shahs (kings) of Iran attempted to control local Talysh chiefs by subordinating them to obedient officials. Nevertheless, despite their centralization strategy, the Safavid administration was unable to terminate the local autonomy in the South Caucasus. Officially, the local chiefs were not hereditary lords, but officials whose rank were acknowledged by a royal firman which in reality was an acceptance of their local autonomy. The familial succession of the chiefs gave rise to dynasties that dominated local affairs and sought to consolidate their influence whenever the national government weakened.

During the decline of Safavid rule in the early 18th-century, Talysh leaders attempted to establish autonomous principalities. During the Russian invasion of Iran, the people of Talish volunteered to fight for the Safavid prince Tahmasp II. The latter was unable to provide them with military or material support; all he could do was give them an ineffective permit that allowed them to collect the taxes of Rasht. In 1723, Russians and Ottomans agreed to divide northern and western Iran between themselves. While the Caspian provinces were under Russian control, one of the local leaders Mir-Abbas Beg, who claimed to be a seyyed (descendant of the Islamic prophet Muhammad), worked together with the Russian commander Mikhail Matyushkin. By the end of 1735, the reconquest of northern and western Iran was completed, being led by the Iranian military leader Nader. It was also during this period that he set his sights on the throne, as he believed his campaigns had stabilised the country and brought him enough fame. On 8 March 1736, he was crowned the new shah of Iran, marking the start of the Afsharid dynasty.

Afsharid and Zand period
Mir-Abbas Beg kept up his relations with the Russians even after they pulled out of Iran. In order to demonstrate his loyalty to Nader Shah, he sent his son Jamal al-Din as a hostage to his court. Due to his dark complexion, Jamal al-Din earned the nickname Qara ("the Black") Beg. He rose to important posts in Nader Shah's army and was assigned the task of putting down Kalb Hoseyn Beg's uprising in southern Talish in 1744. The murder of Nader Shah in 1747 led to the fragment of his empire; in the same fashion as the other rulers in the Southern Caucasus, Jamal al-Din (who had succeeded his father) established himself as a semi-independent ruler, marking the start of the Talysh Khanate, which used Lankaran as its capital.

Jamal al-Din preserved his fathers correspondence with Russia, sending a letter to its empress Catherine II that pledged his allegiance to her and offered the Russian troops access to his domains. The Zand shah of Iran, Karim Khan Zand was informed of this by Zohrab Beg, one of the grandees of Talish. As a result, Jamal al-Din was sent to a prison in Shiraz, the Zand capital. Karim Khan soon reversed his decision after he had discovered that Zohrab Beg had made an agreement with his rival Hedayat-Allah Khan, who ruled Gilan. Jamal al-Din was thus reinstated in Talish as its governor, being given the title of khan. After destroying Zohrab's army and seizing control of Uluf and Dashtvand, Jamal al-Din now directed his attention towards Astara. He captured and killed its ruler Shoja al-Din, but failed to establish his rule in Astara, as the city was given to Shoja al-Din's son by Karim Khan in an attempt to restrict Jamal al-Din's authority. The latter, however, was able to conquer a number of towns in Talish and gain control over most of the region.

After having made peace with Hedayat-Allah Khan in 1767, Karim Khan confirmed the latter as the ruler of Gilan. The following year, Hedayat-Allah Khan launched an attack into Talish, where he defeated and captured Jamal al-Din, imprisoning him in Rasht. He then installed Jamal al-Din's son Mir-Askar Beg as the governor of Talish. In 1772, Jamal al-Din broke out of prison and went back to Talish. In 1784, the Talysh Khanate was attacked by Fath Ali Khan of Quba, the most dominant khan in the Caucasus. He made Jamal al-Din his vassal and also had him imprisoned in Baku. Due to pressure from Russia, however, Jamal al-Din was soon released.

Language 

Talysh has three major dialects, Southern Talyshi (Masali, Masulei, Shandermani and others), Central Talyshi (Asalemi, Hashtpari and others) and Northern Talyshi (spoken in four closely linked dialect sections of Lerik, Masally, Lankaran, Astara in Azerbaijan Republic and in the dialects of Astara, Sayyadlar, Vizane, as well as Anbaran and neighbouring villages in Iran). A transitional stage of these dialects also exist, such as in Jow Kandan-e Bozorg, where a transition between Northern to Central Talyshi is spoken. Linguist Donald Stilo argues that Northern and Southern Talyshi should be regarded as individual languages in the same manner as the Kurdish languages, due to the low intelligibility between the two.

Genetics 
With regards to their NRY-Y-DNA haplogroups, the Talysh show salient Near-Eastern affinities, with haplogroup J2, associated with the advent and diffusion of agriculture in the neolithic Near East, found in over 25% of the sample. Another patriline, haplogroup R1, is also seen to range from 1/4 to up to 1/2, while R1a1, a marker associated with Eastern Indo-European, which includes Indo-Iranian peoples of Central/South Eurasia, only reaches to under 5%, along with haplogroup G.

Location 

Most Talysh in the Republic of Azerbaijan live in a region that stretches from the western bank of the Vilaj River in the north to the Iranian border in the south and from the Caspian Sea in the east to the Iranian border in the West. This region covers the five political districts of Astara, Lankəran, Lerik, Masallı, and Yardımlı. Within these five districts there are over 350 Talysh villages and towns. In recent years, Talysh have also settled in other parts of Azerbaijan. Pockets of Talysh can be found south of the Kura River in the Bilasuvar, Neftcala, and Calilabad districts. Large numbers of Talysh have also moved to the urban surroundings of the capital, Baku. In particular, the cities of Bina and Sumqayıt have seen an influx of Talysh.

Demographics 

According to the Russian Imperial Census of 1897 there were 34,994 Talysh in Baku Governorate.

According to a 1926 census, there were 77,039 Talysh in Azerbaijan SSR.  From 1959 to 1989, the Talysh were not included as a separate ethnic group in any census, but rather they were included as part of the Turkic-speaking Azerbaijanis, although the Talysh speak an Iranian language. 

According to the official 1999 census of the Republic of Azerbaijan the number of Talysh people in the Republic of Azerbaijan was 76,000.  

Talysh nationalists have always asserted that the number of Talysh in Azerbaijan is substantially higher than the official statistics. According to unofficial statistics, between 200,000 and 300,000 Talysh citizens live in Azerbaijan. Some claim that the population of the Talysh inhabiting the southern regions of Azerbaijan is 600,000. The number of Talysh speakers in 2003 was estimated to be at least 400,000 in the Republic of Azerbaijan.  

According to some sources, the Azerbaijani government has also implemented a policy of forceful integration of all minorities, including Talysh, Tat, and Lezgins. However, in a view of Hema Kotecha "the attitude towards any separatist tendencies seems predominantly negative" among the Talysh. According to Swedish scholar on Eurasia Svante E. Cornell Azerbaijani government denies Lezgins claim that the number of Lezgins is many times higher than official numbers, but in private many Azeris acknowledge the fact that Lezgins – for that matter Talysh or the Kurdish population of Azerbaijan is far higher than the official figure. 

Obtaining accurate statistics is difficult, due to the unavailability of reliable sources, intermarriage, and the decline of the Talysh language.

Culture and religion 

The Safavids' campaign of Shi'ite proselytism in Talish remained unfinished because of the district's mountainous, remote location. Because of this, a substantial number of the Talyshis in Iran and the Azerbaijan Republic are adherants of Sunni Islam. The majority of the Talyshis in the Iranian portion of Talish are Sunnis and adherents of the Naqshbandi order. On the other hand, the majority of Talyshis in the Azerbaijani portion of Talish are Shi'ites, with the exception of around twenty-four mountain villages.

During modern history

USSR era 
In the early Soviet period, there were Talysh high schools, a newspaper called "Red Talysh", and several Talysh language books published, but by end of the 1930s these schools were closed and the Talysh identity was not acknowledged in official statistics, with the Talysh being classified as "Azerbaijani".

From 1991 to present 

Historical repression of identity and the inability to practice their culture and language has led the Talysh to an internalized self-repression. This makes it difficult to gauge support for any type of Talysh movement. According to Hema Kotecha, many Talysh fear being associated with the separatist Talysh-Mughan Autonomous Republic, with Russia, or with Armenia if they acknowledge or attempt to talk about their beliefs in the public sphere. The fear of the police is another factor to this silence, although support for secular democracy and shared Azerbaijani-Talysh feelings towards Nagorno-Karabakh contribute as well. The Talysh population is declining; the language is on its way to extinction within 25–35 years, as it is very often not passed on to children. Young Talesh people more frequently use Persian or Azerbaijani in their communities.

Radio Free Europe/Radio Liberty voiced their concerns about the arrest of Novruzali Mamedov, Chairman of the Talysh Cultural Centre and editor-in-chief of the Tolyshi Sado newspaper. According to a U.S. government interview with Khilal Mamedov, a Talysh rights activist, Mr. Mamedov:  “Accused the Azerbaijani leadership of Turkic nationalism and of seeking to suppress non-Turkic minorities…. He said the Azerbaijani leadership seeks to minimize contacts between the Talysh communities in Azerbaijan and Iran and to run Azerbaijan into a monoethnic state.”

, Ismail Shabanov was the president of the Talysh diaspora of Russia.

The National Talysh Movement (NTM)
The National Talysh Movement (NTM) was formally created in 2007 by Talysh leaders exiled in the Netherlands. The members of the organization include those who were in support of the Talysh-Mughan Autonomous Republic such as Alikram Hummatov, the self-proclaimed president of Talysh-Mughan. The movement favors an autonomous region within Azerbaijan. It also demands the promotion of democratic, cultural, and linguistic rights of all minorities within Azerbaijan.

See also 
 Demographics of Azerbaijan
 Citadel of Cadusii

Notes

References

Sources 
 
 
 
 
 
  
 
 
 
 
 
 
 

 
Iranian ethnic groups
Iranian peoples in the Caucasus
Peoples of the Caucasus
Ethnic groups in Iran
Ethnic groups in Azerbaijan
Ethnic groups divided by international borders
Indigenous peoples of Western Asia
Ethnic groups in the Middle East
Muslim communities of the Caucasus